Dernice is a comune (municipality) in the Province of Alessandria in the Italian region Piedmont, located about  southeast of Turin and about  southeast of Alessandria.  It is located across the ancient Salt road, a former commercial road between Genoa and the Padan Plain. It is the seat of production of the Montebore cheese, in the eponymous frazione. It was once home to a castle, now in ruins.

Dernice borders the following municipalities: Borghetto di Borbera, Brignano-Frascata, Cantalupo Ligure, Garbagna, Montacuto, and San Sebastiano Curone.

References

Cities and towns in Piedmont